Kirby Historic District is an American national historic district located at Muncie, Delaware County, Indiana. It encompasses 25 contributing buildings in a predominantly residential section of Muncie.  The district developed between about 1839 and 1930, and includes notable examples of Greek Revival and Colonial Revival style architecture.  Notable buildings include the Thomas Kirby House (1839), William F. Spencer House (1909), John Fitzgibbons House (1918), Theopharia A. Hough House (1909), Pearl Hopkins House (1893), and Edward R. Templar House (1905).

It was added to the National Register of Historic Places in 1999.

References

Historic districts on the National Register of Historic Places in Indiana
Greek Revival architecture in Indiana
Colonial Revival architecture in Indiana
Houses in Muncie, Indiana
Historic districts in Muncie, Indiana
National Register of Historic Places in Muncie, Indiana